Plavka Coleridge (née Lonich; born March 25, 1968) is an American singer. She is best known for being the singer of the German trance act Jam & Spoon, whose classically infused trance sound dominated the international charts in the mid-1990s, as well as for her previous stint with the Shamen.

Biography
Plavka started her vocal training in 1985, and in 1989 sang as a soprano with Santa Monica Opera. Next year she moved from Los Angeles to London, where she joined the British band the Shamen as a vocalist. With the Shamen she toured European and Asian centers, including those in Moscow and Siberia.

In 1990s, Plavka also worked with Caspar Pound, a producer, composer and owner of Rising High Records. They formed Rising High Collective with producer Peter Smith. Around mid-1990s she also joined Jam & Spoon.

Personal life
Plavka married Christopher Coleridge in 2006, they have a daughter Jade. Her younger brother is guitarist Yogi Lonich, who was a member of Buckcherry, Fuel, and Chris Cornell's live band.

Discography

Albums
 En-Tact (1990)
Tripomatic Fairytales 2001 (1993)
Kaleidoscope (1997)
Tripomatic Fairytales 3003 (2004)
Remixes & Club Classics (2006)
Plavkalicious (2009)

Singles
"Chance Me" Plavka, (1988) Mainline Records
"Hyperreal" The Shamen feat. Plavka (1990) One Little Indian
 "Fever Called Love" Rising High Collective (1991) R&S Records
"Reach" Rising High Collective (1992) Rising High Records
"Maximum Motion" Plavka (1993) Ascension Records
"Right in the Night (Fall in Love with Music)" Jam & Spoon feat. Plavka (1993) JAM! Sony Dance Pool
"Find Me (Odyssey to Anyoona)" Jam & Spoon feat. Plavka (1994) JAM! Sony Dance Pool
"Liquid Thoughts" (EP feat Tangled in My Thoughts) Rising High Collective (1994) Rising High Records
"Feel the Fire" RHC feat. Plavka (1995) Ascension Records
"Angel (Ladadi O-Heyo)" Jam & Spoon feat. Plavka (1995) JAM! Sony Dance Pool
"Kaleidoscope Skies" Jam & Spoon feat. Plavka (1997) JAM! Sony Dance Pool
"Don't Call It Love" Jam & Spoon feat. Plavka (1998) JAM! Sony Dance Pool
"Your Everything" Mistral feat. Plavka (2002) Black Hole
"Butterfly Sign" Jam & Spoon feat. Plavka (2004) Universal Music
"Razorblade" Ils feat. Plavka (2007) Distinctive Records
"Love Sick" NUfrequency feat. Plavka (2007) Rebirth
"Love Story" Rudenko feat. Plavka (2009) Be Yourself Music
"Surrender" J Nitti feat. Plavka (2010) Armada Records
"Redlight Town" Swagger feat. Plavka (2012) Housepital Records
"Right in the Night 2013" Jam & Spoon feat. Plavka Mixed by David May & Amfree (2013) Sony Columbia
"Uh Oh" Plavka 2020 (2021) Plavka Music
"Modern Tragedy" written & performed by Plavka. Produced by Zootrop (2021)
"Underneath the Hollywood Sign" EP Plavka (2021) Plavka Music
"On a High Frequency" Plavka (2022) Plavka Music

References

External links
Rising High Collective, Discogs.com; accessed June 16, 2018. 
Interview with Plavka, soundcloud.com; accessed June 16, 2018.

Living people
American dance musicians
American expatriates in the United Kingdom
American women singers
American people of Croatian descent
American people of Peruvian descent
Peruvian people of Croatian descent
Musicians from London
Musicians from Los Angeles
Singers from California
The Shamen members
1968 births